8 was a designation given to two New York City Subway services. It was first used by the Brooklyn–Manhattan Transit Corporation for its Astoria Line from 1917 to 1949. The ex-Interborough Rapid Transit Company (IRT) Third Avenue El subsequently used the designation between 1967 and 1973.

Astoria Line 

The 8 label was first used for the Astoria Line, which opened on February 1, 1917, as an extension of the Queensboro Line (now part of the Flushing line) from Queensboro Plaza. The Corona Line (now also part of the Flushing Line) had already been built as another branch from Queensboro Plaza; when the Astoria Line opened half the trains ran to each terminal. At the time, the Queensboro Line ended on the other side of the Steinway Tunnel at Grand Central.

Tracks opened over the Queensboro Bridge on July 23, 1917, allowing elevated trains of the IRT Second Avenue Line to operate to Queensborough Plaza and then over either the Astoria or Corona line. Once this link opened, all elevated trains went to Astoria, and all subway trains to Corona, but this was modified by 1923, with both divisions running on each line. On March 22, 1926, the Queensborough Line (and Astoria service) was extended west to Fifth Avenue, and it was completed west to Times Square on March 14, 1927.

BMT shuttles (coincidentally also labeled internally as 8) began using the Astoria Line on April 8, 1923, with a transfer to the Broadway Line at Queensborough Plaza. This joint operation ended on October 17, 1949, and all IRT trains started operating to Flushing (where the Corona Line had been extended in 1928) and all BMT trains operated to Astoria. The numbers were only publicly used starting in 1948, so the public only knew the Astoria Line's IRT services as the 8 for about a year. Direct service between Astoria and Times Square ended on July 24, 1949.

Third Avenue Line 

When the Chrystie Street Connection opened in late 1967, the New York City Transit Authority assigned labels to all services. The only remaining IRT elevated line, the IRT Third Avenue Line in the Bronx, was too long to be a shuttle, so was assigned the number 8, unused since 1949. This service, running between 149th Street and Gun Hill Road, last ran on April 28, 1973, when the Third Avenue Line closed. Thereafter, it was replaced by the  bus route until 2013, when most of the former route started being served by the Bx15 Limited. The 8 bullet was only marked on maps and station signs, never on cars. Cars instead displayed SHUTTLE and the destination.

Present status 

See also 
 BMT 8, the BMT service that operated in tandem with this service until 1949
 Unused New York City Subway service labels

References 

 
 
 
 
 
 
 

Defunct New York City Subway services